Kei Igarashi (五十嵐 圭、born May 7, 1980 in Jōetsu, Niigata, Japan) is a Japanese professional basketball player. He plays for the Gunma Crane Thunders of the B.League. 
He also was a member of the Japan national basketball team, playing for the team in the 2006 FIBA World Championship and both the FIBA Asia Championship 2007 and FIBA Asia Championship 2009.

Igarashi averaged 9 points and 3 assists per game for the host Japanese at the 2006 FIBA World Championship.  Igarashi scored a team-high 18 points and added three assists in Japan's lone win at the tournament, a 78-61 preliminary round victory over Panama.  In his most recent, national team appearance, Igarashi had a team-leading 3.6 assists per game, good for third best overall in the tournament.  Despite his performance, Japan stumbled to a disappointing tenth-place finish, its worst ever performance in 24 FIBA Asia Championship appearances.

In the 2009-10 season, he entered the month-long winter break averaging 9.3 points and 2.9 assists per game for the Alvark.  The popular Igarashi was also named to the JBL All-Star Game as the leading point guard vote-getter for the East.

References

1980 births
Living people
Alvark Tokyo players
Japanese men's basketball players
Sportspeople from Niigata Prefecture
Point guards
Nagoya Diamond Dolphins players
Niigata Albirex BB players
Sun Rockers Shibuya players
2006 FIBA World Championship players